Matija Duh (3 April 1989 – 3 February 2013) was a Slovenian international motorcycle speedway rider.

Duh raced in Poland for KSM Krosno, Orzeł Łódź, and Ostrovia Ostrów Wielkopolski. He also represented Slovenia on several occasions. Duh appeared in two Grand Prix - the Croatian events in 2010 and 2011, where he appeared as a reserve.

Death
Duh suffered multiple injuries, including skull fractures, a brain haemorrhage, and a fractured hip, in a crash while racing in an Argentine Championship meeting at the Bahía Blanca track in Argentina on 30 January 2013, and died on 3 February, 2 months before his 24th birthday.

References

1989 births
2013 deaths
Slovenian speedway riders
Motorcycle racers who died while racing
Sport deaths in Argentina